Charles Teiko Folley (born 1 November 1991) is a Ghanaian footballer who currently plays as a forward.

Career statistics

Club

Notes

References

1991 births
Living people
Ghanaian footballers
Ghanaian expatriate footballers
Association football forwards
I-League players
Ittihad Al-Zarqa players
Gönyeli S.K. players
Aswan SC players
Expatriate footballers in Tajikistan
Expatriate footballers in Jordan
Expatriate footballers in Egypt
Ghanaian expatriate sportspeople in Egypt
Expatriate footballers in Northern Cyprus
Ghanaian expatriate sportspeople in Northern Cyprus
Expatriate footballers in India
Ghanaian expatriate sportspeople in India